Tefenni is a town in Burdur Province in the Mediterranean region of Turkey. It is the seat of Tefenni District. Its population is 7,381 (2021). It consists of 10 quarters: Kır, Yenice, Yokuş, Zafer, Esentepe, Eceköy, Eşeler, Fatih, Pazar and Göktürk.

References

External links
 District municipality's official website 

Populated places in Tefenni District
Towns in Turkey